Belegiš is a village in Serbia. It is situated in the Stara Pazova municipality, in the Srem District, Vojvodina province. The village has a Serb ethnic majority and its population numbering 3,116 people (2002 census).

History

A Bronze Age Somogyvár-Vinkovci culture (Vatin culture) necropolis was found in Grac, with ceramics.

Belegiš culture

Population
1961: 2,633
1971: 2,440
1981: 2,430
1991: 2,605
2011: 2,973

See also
List of places in Serbia
List of cities, towns and villages in Vojvodina

References
Slobodan Ćurčić, Broj stanovnika Vojvodine, Novi Sad, 1996.
https://www.stat.gov.rs/sr-latn/oblasti/popis/popis-2011

External links 

The church in Belegiš
Belegiš at poi.rs

 

Populated places in Syrmia